The Julaha (Weaver) are a community of Pakistan and India, which adopted the profession of weaving.

Etymology
The term Julaha may derive from the Persian julah (ball of thread). Other explanation put forth by Julaha themselves include
"jal (net), jils (decorated) or uila (lighted up, or white)."

Both Hindu and Muslim Julaha groups exist; a number of the Muslim Julaha later changed their group name to terms such as Ansari (but not all Ansari's are julaha, as only few julaha's changed their title to Ansari).

See also 
 Malik (Julaha)
 Dogra
 Haral Chuhra
 Kabir panth
 Bhuiyar
 Meghwal

References 

Weaving communities of South Asia
Social groups of India
Ethnic groups in India
Social groups of Pakistan